The Loop may refer to:

Entertainment and media

Books
The Loop, a 1992 novel by Joe Coomer
The Loop, a 1998 novel by Nicholas Evans

Film and television
The Loop (Australian TV series), an Australian music television show
The Loop (American TV series), a comedy television show on the Fox network
"The Loop", a segment on American television show Attack of the Show!
Tales from the Loop (American TV series), a Science Fiction drama based on the art of Simon Stålenhag

Music
The Loop (Johnny Lytle album)
The Loop (Andrew Cyrille album), 1978
The Loop, a music remix group formed in 1993 by members of Celebrate the Nun
"The Loop", a song by Morrissey from World of Morrissey

Radio
WCKL (FM) (97.9 FM), a religious music station in Chicago formerly branded as classic rock station The Loop (WLUP-FM)
WKQX (FM), a rock radio station in Chicago a classic rock format branded as "The Loop"

Neighborhoods 
 Chicago Loop, the central business district of Chicago, Illinois, U.S.
 Delmar Loop, a district in St. Louis and University City, Missouri, U.S.

Transportation

Bicycle/pedestrian infrastructure
 The Loop (Tucson), a network of shared-use paths in Tucson, Arizona, U.S.

Rail transportation
 Alaska Central Railroad Tunnel No. 1, a tunnel and trestle in Alaska, known colloquially as "The Loop" or "The Loop District"
 Loop (Amtrak train), a former Amtrak train service between Chicago and Springfield, Illinois, U.S.
 The Loop (CTA), an elevated rail circuit in downtown Chicago, Illinois, U.S.
 Tehachapi Loop, a railway spiral in California, U.S.

Road transportation 
 Interstate 610 (Texas), a beltway in Houston, Texas, U.S.
 Leeds loop, a traffic distribution route in the city centre of Leeds, United Kingdom
 Loop Parkway, a spur of the Meadowbrook State Parkway on Long Island, New York, U.S.
 Massachusetts Route 213, a highway between I-93 and I-495 in Massachusetts, U.S.
 The Loop (Texarkana), a beltway around Texarkana, Texas and Arkansas, U.S.

Other uses
 The Loop (Methuen, Massachusetts), a shopping center in Massachusetts, U.S.
 The Loop (Kissimmee), a strip shopping mall on the north side of Kissimmee, Florida, U.S.

See also
Loop (disambiguation)
In the Loop (disambiguation)
Out of the Loop (disambiguation)